Southeast Ambrym, Vatlongos, or Taveak, is a language of Ambrym Island, Vanuatu. It is closely related to Paamese.

References

External links
 

Paama–Ambrym languages
Languages of Vanuatu